The 1978 Virginia Slims of Hollywood  was a women's tennis tournament played on indoor carpet courts at the Sportatorium  in Hollywood, Florida, United States, that was part of the 1978 Virginia Slims World Championship Series. It was the second edition of the tournament and was held from January 9 through January 15, 1978. Second-seeded Evonne Goolagong Cawley won the singles title and earned $20,000 first-prize money.

Winners

Singles
 Evonne Goolagong Cawley defeated  Wendy Turnbull 6–2, 6–3

Doubles
 Rosie Casals /  Wendy Turnbull defeated  Françoise Dürr /  Virginia Wade 6–2, 6–4

Prize money

References

External links
 ITF tournament edition details

Virginia Slims of Hollywood
Virginia Slims of Hollywood
Virginia Slims of Hollywood
Virginia Slims of Hollywood